The Battle of Duyon River was a naval engagement between the Portuguese forces commanded by Nuno Álvares Botelho, who is renowned in Portugal as one of the last great commanders of Portuguese India, and the forces of the Sultanate of Aceh, which were led by Lassemane (Malay laksamana i.e. admiral).

The relatively modest Portuguese fleet achieved an absolute victory over the Ottoman-allied Aceh in such decisive ways that not a single ship or man of the invading force sent to conquer Malacca got back to its country. The Sultanate of Perak, a vassal of the Sultanate of Aceh, defected to the Portuguese side on the occasion.

Background

The 1629 Acehnese attack on Portuguese Malacca came about in the context of growing presence of vessels of the Dutch VOC and the English EIC in the Indian Ocean. Sultan Iskandar Muda of Aceh sought to capture Malacca before either the EIC or the VOC had done so and replaced the Portuguese as overlords of the most important trade emporium in the strategically paramount Strait of Malacca.

In 1628, the Portuguese destroyed an advance Acehnese fleet at the Langat River, sent to raid their shipping. Notwithstanding this setback, the Sultan proceeded with preparations for the attack on Malacca, yet this raised some doubts among his command: the admiral of the fleet, identified by the Portuguese as Lassemane (literally, "admiral"), opposed the campaign. Another experienced commander, identified in Portuguese sources as Marraja argued that the Portuguese would not only be unable to resist a strong siege but that any relief was unlikely, and Sultan sided with his opinion, probably because that was what he wanted to hear.

Portuguese command at Malacca suspected of Acehnese preparations, hence a notable resident, Pero de Abreu, was sent to Aceh as an ambassador to confirm a peace treaty the Sultan had previously signed with the Portuguese, but Abreu was arrested and the treaty disregarded. Despite his arrest, Abreu managed to send out a message to Malacca warning of the impending attack. As a result, the Portuguese captain-general of the Southern Sea António Pinto da Fonseca and the captain of Malacca ordered the defenses of the city built up, while envoys were dispatched to Goa requesting reinforcements as well as to the Portuguese-allied Sultan of Johor, who traded extensively with the Portuguese and despised the Sultan of Aceh.

The Portuguese captain-major of the Sea of Malacca Francisco Lopes was sent to the vicinity of Aceh with a nimble force of native boats to gather intel, and he captured a vessel that fortuitously transported the son-in-law of the Sultan plus a number of other Acehnese princes, then fleeing from the sultans despotic rule; they revealed to the Portuguese everything regarding the ongoing preparations.

The siege

The Acehnese fleet appeared before Malacca on the first days of June 1629, numbering 236 vessels, 38 of which were very large galleys with three masts bearing top-sails, and armed with heavy bombards capable of firing 20 kg shots, equivalent to galleasses or nearly. It bore about 19,000 men, furnished with siege artillery and material, personnaly commanded by the Sultan of Aceh. A few days after arriving however, the Sultan decided to return home and leave the fleet under the command of Marraja, while overall command was entrusted to Lassemane.

The defenses of Malacca included 260 Portuguese soldiers, 120 casados (literally, "married men", Portuguese residents and Luso-Malay descendants) able to bear arms plus a corps of 400 native Christian auxiliaries, but the city was well fortified, well furnished with provisions and prepared for a drawn-out siege. 2000 warriors sent by the Sultan of Johor arrived from Pahang shortly after the Acehnese, to aid the Portuguese.

Fearful that his ships might be caught off-guard by a Portuguese fleet if he left it anchored out on the open sea, Lassemane decided harbour it within the Duyon River one league to southeast of Malacca. Seven Acehnese galleys remained outside to intercept any passing merchant vessels carrying provisions to Malacca, but this course of action was ineffective: captain-general António Pinto da Fonseca had vessels stationed at Pulo Butum and the Strait of Singapore to warn any incoming vessels of the presence of the Acehnese fleet, while at night captain-major Francisco Lopes ran the blockade with light boats, and escorted the merchant vessels into the city, eluding Acehnese patrols, hence throughout the duration of the siege Malacca remained supplied.

On June 6, Lassemane began disembarking his troops and approaching the city. Despite the Portuguese captain-general sallying out and clashing with the Acehnese to keep them at bay, the Portuguese were gradually forced to relinquish their outer rings of defenses and stockades to the great multitude of enemies, till at the end of a few weeks they had retreated within the city walls.

Disease sparked among the Acehnese, killing many. Encouraged by his success in approaching the city however, Lassemane detached two galleys to inform the Sultan that he expected to have Malacca captured briefly, yet these vessels were intercepted by a 60 vessel war-fleet arriving from Johor. All remaining Acehnese vessels withdrew into the Duyon River to avoid capture, and thus the naval line of communication and supply into Malacca was definitively secured, ruling out the possibility of starving the Portuguese out.

In spite of the superiority of his fleet relative to that of Johor, Lassemane chose to ignore it and remain on land to prepare a final assault on the city instead.

Portuguese relief

Portuguese India was governed by the aging Bishop of Cochin Luís de Brito in replacement of Viceroy Francisco da Gama, who had been dismissed under the accusation of irregularities. The Bishop ordered Miguel Pereira Borralho, then patrolling the Coromandel Coast with a force of light galleys to proceed to Malacca, but then died on June 29. He was succeeded by a council composed by the captain of Goa Lourenço da Cunha, senior-chancellor Gonçalo Pinto da Fonseca, and Captain-Major of the High Freeboard Fleet of India Dom Nuno Álvares Botelho. Botelho volunteered to personally lead the projected relief force to Malacca, and as he was a highly respected figure among Portuguese ranks the Portuguese residents of Goa enthusiastically contributed with men, money and supplies for the outfitting of the naval force. Dom Nuno also participated with his own money, and actually went bankrupt in the process; nevertheless, in order to help two officers who had lost their horses, he offered them his own, and proceeded with the arrangements on foot, which garnered him widespread esteem among his soldiers. The fleet departed from Goa in high spirits on September 8, 1629 to Malaysia numbering 1 brigantine, 5 half-galleys and 23 light galleys, bearing 900 Portuguese soldiers.

On September 30, Borralho reached Malacca with 100 soldiers, which caused great joy on both the defenders as well as the Acehnese, who believed that was all the relief the Portuguese could hope for.

On October 21s by daybreak the fleet of Botelho arrived in Malacca, brightly decorated and draped in colourful flags, saluting the city with gun salvos, drums, and the shouting of the crews, which were enthusiastically replied by the citys cannon and the ringing of church bells. Among the Acehnese however, morale dropped.  After Botelho had been briefed on the situation, the Portuguese fleet took position by the mouth of the Duyon River, three brigantines having joined it, and thus trapping the Acehnese within. The following day, the Acehnese abandoned their positions and hurriedly retreated to Duyon River to protect their ships.

River battle

Within Duyon river 136 Acehnese ships remained, as many had been dismantled to erect strong stockades furnished with artillery along each of the river banks. Portuguese ships could not enter the river due to their deeper draught, while the land side fortifications were difficult to assault. Dom Nuno had a ship loaded with stones deliberately sunk by the rivermouth to block the Acehnese fleet from sallying out, while two large gun-barges heavily protected with rope mats and pavises bombarded it from the rivermouth. Acehnese gunners managed to sink one barge, but it was replaced by a brigantine.

Dom Nuno offered Lassemane the chance to capitulate on October 29, but the Acehnese commander replied with a challenge to single-duel, which was ignored. By this point the Acehnese were reduced to no more than 4000 able-bodied men due to disease, desertion and death in combat. Early in November, the Acehnese attempted to dislodge the sunken vessel at the rivermouth under the darkness of the night, however they were detected and forced back.

With the coming of the spring tide on November 8, the Acehnese attempted a final, determined push out of the river, led by their flagship, a very large galley named Wonder of the World. The Acehnese flagship however crashed against the sunken vessel and came under heavy fire from Portuguese artillery and fire bombs lobbed from Portuguese boats. Unable to break out, it was towed back into the river in flames.

On November 30, Marraja died of an unrecorded cause, and that same day the Portuguese were joined by a strong fleet of 60 vessels from Johor and 100 from Patani, transporting 9000 warriors and personally commanded by the Sultan of Johor.  They would take no part in the fighting, as upon being informed of their arrival Lassemane finally sent out the ambassador Pero de Abreu to inform the Portuguese that he wished for terms.

Aftermath

As Dom Nuno demanded the inconditional surrender of the Acehnese, Lassemane refused to give himself in. He decided instead to set his ships on fire, abandon the wounded and proceed to Pahang overland on December 6 so as to surrender there.  The Portuguese captured considerable spoil from the Acehnese camp, that included 30 galleys, 170 Ottoman, Dutch, English and Portuguese artillery pieces, and thousands of firearms and other weapons.

After his triumph, Dom Nuno Álvares Botelho was received by the population of Malacca in apotheosis, and his great achievement was greatly celebrated with long festivities, and in Portugal as well. The Sultan of Johor was also received ashore with full honours. On January Lassemane reached Pahang, but he was arrested and delivered to the Portuguese.

The huge Acehnese flagship "Wonder of the World" was captured, repaired, and displayed at Malacca and Goa to be admired by the population.  The Sultan of Perak, a vassal of the Sultan of Aceh, defected and rejoined the Portuguese as an ally.

References

Duyon River
Duyon River
1629 in Portuguese Malacca